Jan Mlakar (born 23 October 1998) is a Slovenian footballer who plays as a forward for Hajduk Split.

Club career

Early career
Born in Ljubljana, Slovenia, Mlakar started playing football at his hometown club Alfa, before moving to Domžale. In early 2015, at the age of 16, Mlakar was transferred to the Italian Serie A side Fiorentina for a reported fee of €1 million. He captained Fiorentina's under-19 side and was also the team's top goalscorer in the 2016–17 season. He made his professional senior debut on 30 April 2017 in a league match against Palermo, replacing his fellow countryman Josip Iličić in the 70th minute. For the 2017–18 season, he was loaned to the Serie B side Venezia, where he made three league appearances.

In January 2018, Mlakar returned to Slovenia and joined Maribor, signing a four-and-a-half-year contract.

Brighton & Hove Albion

In January 2019, Mlakar signed a three-and-a-half year contract with Brighton & Hove Albion. He was immediately loaned back to Maribor until the end of the season. With the team, he won his first senior trophy as Maribor were crowned champions during the 2018–19 season. Overall, Mlakar scored 17 goals for Maribor in 44 appearances over a span of two seasons.

Queens Park Rangers (loan)
Upon return, he was loaned out again on 24 July 2019 to the Championship side Queens Park Rangers in a one-year deal. Mlakar made his debut for The R's on 13 August 2019 in the first round of the EFL Cup against Bristol City, where he came on as a substitute. The game finished 3–3 with QPR winning 5–4 on penalties. His first start also came in the EFL Cup where he played the full match in the 2–0 home defeat against Portsmouth. He made his league debut coming on as a substitute in a 2–1 away win over Sheffield Wednesday on 31 August 2019.

Wigan Athletic (loan)
After being recalled by Brighton from QPR in January 2020, he joined another Championship side, Wigan Athletic, on loan until the end of the season. On 4 July 2020, Mlakar made his debut for the Latics, coming on as a substitute away at Brentford in a 3–0 defeat.

Maribor (loan)
On 14 August 2020, Brighton have sent Mlakar on another loan to the Slovenian PrvaLiga side Maribor until the end of the 2020–21 season. He scored his first goal on his return to Slovenia in his second appearance on 12 September in a 4–1 home victory over Bravo after coming on as a substitute.

Hajduk Split
On 1 July 2021, Mlakar signed a four-year contract with Croatian club Hajduk Split. On 17 July, he made his debut in a Croatian First League match against Lokomotiva Zagreb. During the match, he scored both Hajduk's goals in an eventual 2–2 draw.

International career
Mlakar was capped for Slovenia at all youth levels from under-15 to under-21. He was the top goalscorer of the qualifications for the 2015 UEFA European Under-17 Championship, with eight goals. In June 2019, Mlakar was included in the senior squad for the UEFA Euro 2020 qualifying match against Latvia, however, he was an unused substitution.

As the captain of the under-21 team, he led the player's rebellion against the manager Primož Gliha in October 2020 due to his alleged inappropriate behavior towards players. As a result, Gliha was sacked by the Football Association of Slovenia, and Mlakar was not included in the 2021 UEFA European Under-21 Championship squad by the new manager Milenko Ačimovič.

Mlakar was part of the senior squad for friendlies away to North Macedonia and at home against Gibraltar in June 2021. He debuted against the former on 1 June 2021, starting the match and playing for 79 minutes in an eventual 1–1 draw. He also started the game at home against Gibraltar on 4 June, where he scored his first senior international goal, putting his nation 4–0 ahead in an eventual 6–0 win.

Career statistics

Club

International

Scores and results list Slovenia's goal tally first, score column indicates score after each Mlakar goal.

Honours
Maribor
Slovenian PrvaLiga: 2018–19
Slovenian Cup runner-up: 2018–19

Hajduk Split
Croatian Cup: 2021–22
Croatian Super Cup runner-up: 2022

Individual
Slovenian PrvaLiga top scorer: 2020–21

References

External links
NZS profile 

1998 births
Living people
Footballers from Ljubljana
Slovenian footballers
Association football forwards
Slovenian expatriate footballers
Slovenian expatriate sportspeople in Italy
Expatriate footballers in Italy
Slovenian expatriate sportspeople in England
Expatriate footballers in England
Slovenian expatriate sportspeople in Croatia
Expatriate footballers in Croatia
ACF Fiorentina players
Venezia F.C. players
NK Maribor players
Brighton & Hove Albion F.C. players
Queens Park Rangers F.C. players
Wigan Athletic F.C. players
HNK Hajduk Split players
Serie A players
Serie B players
Slovenian PrvaLiga players
English Football League players
Croatian Football League players
Slovenia youth international footballers
Slovenia under-21 international footballers
Slovenia international footballers